Hasenpfeffer is a traditional Dutch and German stew made from marinated rabbit or hare, cut into stewing-meat sized pieces and braised with onions and a marinade made from wine and vinegar.

Description
Hase is German for "hare", and Pfeffer is German for "pepper", although in the culinary context it refers generically to the spices and seasonings in a dish overall, as with the German ginger cookies called Pfeffernüsse. Seasonings typically include fresh cracked black pepper or whole peppercorns, along with salt, onions, garlic, lemon, sage, thyme, rosemary, allspice, juniper berries, cloves, and bay leaf. 

In Dutch the term "Hazenpeper" was first attested in 1599 and also mentioned in 1778, both as 'a dish made with the meat of a hare'.

In Bavaria and Austria, the cuisines of which have been influenced by neighboring Hungarian and Czech culinary traditions, hasenpfeffer can include sweet or hot paprika.

In the Netherlands the dish is often made with some added ontbijtkoek (also referred to as "peperkoek"), to give the stew some extra flavour and texture, whereas in Germany ginger cookies called "Pfeffernüsse" are generally used instead.

In popular culture
The 1932 Fleischer Studios cartoon Minnie the Moocher begins with Betty Boop getting into an argument with her strict immigrant parents when she will not eat the traditional hasenpfeffer, resulting in her running away from home.

The 1962 Looney Tunes short Shishkabugs features Yosemite Sam as a palace cook who is ordered by the king to prepare hasenpfeffer, but he does not know what hasenpfeffer is. Upon learning from a book of recipes that the main ingredient is rabbit, he sets about trying to capture Bugs Bunny for the dish. Hasenpfeffer is also mentioned in Big House Bunny.

In the opening credits of the American sitcom Laverne & Shirley, Laverne and Shirley recite a Yiddish-American hopscotch chant: "1, 2, 3, 4, 5, 6, 7, 8. Schlemiel! Schlimazel! Hasenpfeffer Incorporated."

In D2: The Mighty Ducks, Jan's breakfast specialty is hasenpfeffer and eggs.

In the Season 9 episode of The Office titled "Dwight Christmas", Dwight suggests having an “authentic Pennsylvania Dutch Christmas” where the office workers have glühwein and hasenpfeffer.

In the 1961 song G.I. Blues by Elvis Presley he sings that the American occupying soldiers in Allied-occupied Germany "get hasenpfeffer and black Pumpernickel for chow"

In the song "Don't Be the Bunny" from the 2001 musical "Urinetown," Mr. Cladwell sings "Hasenpfeffer's in the air."

In the 2005 musical "25th Annual Putnam County Spelling Bee," William Barfée correctly spells the word "hasenpfeffer" in the number "Magic Foot."

See also
 List of stews
 Rabbit stew

References

External links 
 
 

German stews
Rabbit dishes